North Longford was a UK parliamentary constituency in Ireland. It returned one Member of Parliament (MP) to the British House of Commons 1885–1918.

Prior to the 1885 United Kingdom general election and after the dissolution of Parliament in 1918 the area was part of the Longford constituency.

Boundaries
This constituency comprised the northern part of County Longford.

1885–1918: The barony of Granard, that part of the barony of Longford consisting of the parish of Killoe and the townland of Kiltyreher in the parish of Templemichael, and that part of the barony of Ardagh contained within the parishes of Mostrim and Street, the townlands of Cartronreagh and Rinvanny in the parish of Clonbroney, and the townland of Castlenugent in the parish of Granard.

Members of Parliament

Elections

Elections in the 1880s

McCarthy is also elected MP for Londonderry City and opts to sit there, causing a by-election.

Elections in the 1890s

Elections in the 1900s

Elections in the 1910s

References

Westminster constituencies in County Longford (historic)
Constituencies of the Parliament of the United Kingdom established in 1885
Constituencies of the Parliament of the United Kingdom disestablished in 1918